Livezi is a commune located in Vâlcea County, Oltenia, Romania. It is composed of seven villages: Livezi, Părăușani, Pârâienii de Jos, Pârâienii de Mijloc, Pârâienii de Sus, Pleșoiu and Tina.

References

Communes in Vâlcea County
Localities in Oltenia